The American Brass Superfund site is a former industrial site,  located in Henry County, Alabama. American Brass Inc. (ABI) operated a brass smelter and foundry facility on the site between 1978 and 1992. Prior to its closure in December 1992, the company had been cited by the United States Environmental Protection Agency (EPA), and the Alabama Department of Environmental Management, (ADEM), on several occasions for Resource Conservation and Recovery Act (RCRA) violations, arising from its waste and hazardous waste disposal processes. Site surveys, conducted by ADEM after ABI ceased operations, revealed stockpiles of 150,000 tons of contaminated waste, and extensive soil and groundwater contamination.

After assessment by the EPA, it was added to the National Priorities List, in May 1999, for long-term remedial action.

See also
List of Superfund sites
Groundwater remediation
Soil contamination

References

Environmental disasters in the United States
Water pollution in the United States
Superfund sites in Alabama
Soil contamination